Noita is the ninth studio album by Finnish folk metal band Korpiklaani. The title is the Finnish word for "witch", but is closer in meaning to "shaman," "witch-doctor," or "medicine man."

The track "Jouni Jouni" is a cover version of the song "Mony Mony" by Tommy James and the Shondells.

Track listing

Personnel
 Jonne Järvelä – vocals, guitar
 Jarkko Aaltonen – bass
 Matti "Matson" Johansson – drums
 Sami Perttula – accordion
 Tuomas Rounakari – violin
 Kalle "Cane" Savijärvi – guitar
 Tuomas Keskimäki - Lyrics

Charts

References

2015 albums
Korpiklaani albums
Nuclear Blast albums